Herodias (Hērǭdiás; c. 15 BC – after AD 39) was a princess of the Herodian dynasty of Judaea during the time of the Roman Empire. Christian writings connect her with John the Baptist's execution.

Family relationships
Daughter of Aristobulus IV and his wife Berenice.
Full sister to Herod V (king of Chalkis), Herod Agrippa (king of Judea), Aristobulus Minor, and Mariamne III (wife of Crown Prince Antipater and, after his execution by Herod the Great, she was possibly the first wife of Herod Archelaus, principal heir of Herod the Great and ethnarch of Judea).

Marriages

Herod II
Herod the Great executed his sons, Alexander and Aristobulus IV, in 7 BC, and engaged Herodias to Herod II (born ca. 27 BC; died AD 33), her half-uncle.  The marriage was opposed by Antipater II, Herod the Great's eldest son, and so Herod demoted Herod II to second in line to the throne. Antipater's execution in 4 BC for plotting to poison his father left Herod II as first in line, but his mother's knowledge of the poison plot, and failure to stop it, led to his being dropped from this position in Herod I's will just days before he died.

Both the Gospel of Matthew and Gospel of Mark state that Herodias was married to Philip, therefore some scholars have argued his name was "Herod Philip" (not to be confused with Philip the Tetrarch, whom some writers call Herod Philip II). Many scholars dispute this, however, and believe it was an error, a theory supported by the fact that the Gospel of Luke drops the name Philip. Because he was the grandson of the high priest Simon Boethus he is sometimes described as Herod Boethus, but there is no evidence he was called by that name.

There was one daughter from this marriage, Salome. Herodias later divorced Herod II, although it is unclear when they were divorced. According to the historian Josephus:Herodias took upon her to confound the laws of our country, and divorced herself from her husband while he was alive, and was married to Herod Antipas

Herod Antipas
Herodias' second husband was Herod Antipas (born before 20 BC; died after 39 AD) half-brother of Herod II (her first husband).  He is best known today for his role in events that led to the executions of John the Baptist and Jesus of Nazareth.

Antipas divorced his first wife Phasaelis, the daughter of King Aretas IV of Nabatea, in favor of Herodias. According to biblical scholars, the Gospel of Matthew and the Gospel of Luke, it was this proposed marriage which John the Baptist publicly criticized. Aside from provoking his conflict with the Baptist, the tetrarch's divorce added a personal grievance to previous disputes with Aretas over territory on the border of Perea and Nabatea. Aretas sent an army to punish Antipas, and was joined in this endeavor by auxiliary troops from the province of Syria. Josephus calls these troops 'fugitives', while Moses of Chorene  says they were the army of King Abgarus V of Edessa, under the command of commander Khosran Ardzrouni. 

The result of this war proved disastrous for Antipas; a Roman counter-offensive was ordered by Tiberius, but abandoned upon that emperor's death in 37 AD. In 39 AD Antipas was accused by his nephew/brother-in-law Agrippa I of conspiracy against the new Roman emperor Caligula, who sent him into exile in Gaul. Accompanied there by Herodias, he died at an unknown date. It is uncertain if Herodias had any children by her second husband, Herod Antipas.

In the Gospels

In the Gospels of Matthew and Mark, Herodias plays a major role in John the Baptist's execution, using her daughter's dance before Antipas and his party guests to ask for the head of the Baptist as a reward. According to the Gospel of Mark, Antipas did not want to put John the Baptist to death, for Antipas liked to listen to John the Baptist preach (Mark 6:20). Furthermore, Antipas may have feared that if John the Baptist were to be put to death, his followers would riot. The Gospel of Luke amplifies the role of Herod by omitting these details.

Modern scholarship 
Some biblical scholars have questioned whether the Gospels give historically accurate accounts of John the Baptist's execution. Some exegetes believe that Antipas' struggle with John the Baptist as told in the Gospels was some kind of a remembrance of the political and religious fight opposing the Israelite monarchs Ahab and Jezebel to the prophet Elijah.

In medieval literature

In medieval Europe a widespread belief held Herodias to be the supernatural leader of a supposed cult of witches, synonymous with Diana, Holda and Abundia.

In art and fiction
Together with Salome, Herodias was a frequent subject in depictions of the Power of Women topos in the later Medieval and Renaissance periods. The most common moment shown including Herodias is the Feast of Herod, showing Salome presenting John's severed head on a platter as Herodias dines with her husband and others

Stories, plays
 Hérodias, story by Gustave Flaubert, one of the Three Tales (Trois contes), published in 1877.
 Salomé, play by Oscar Wilde, French (1894), translated into English by Lord Alfred Douglas, 1895.
 Salome: The Wandering Jewess. My First 2,000 Years of Love, by George Sylvester Viereck, 1930.

Music
 Hérodiade, opera by Jules Massenet, based on the story by Gustave Flaubert.
 Salome, opera by Richard Strauss, based on a German translation (by Hedwig Lachmann, grandmother of Mike Nichols) of the play by Oscar Wilde.
 Salomé, an opera by French composer Antoine Mariotte, set to a French libretto based on Oscar Wilde's play.
 In Parsifal, the opera by Richard Wagner, the lead female character of Kundry is revealed to be Herodias, in the second act.  In the opera she was said to have laughed at Christ when she saw him being crucified and was cursed with immortality. She eventually finds redemption through the actions of Parsifal.
 "Salome", a song by Irish rock band U2.

Other
 Hérodiade, ballet by Paul Hindemith.
 Hérodiade, oil painting by Aimé Morot.

In film 

 In the American film,  Salome (1953 film), Herodias was played by Judith Anderson.
 In the American film The Greatest Story Ever Told, Herodias was played by Marian Seldes.
 In the Jesus of Nazareth (miniseries), Herodias was played by Valentina Cortese.

See also
List of biblical figures identified in extra-biblical sources

References

Further reading
 Gillman, Florence Morgan. Herodias: At Home in the Fox's Den. Interfaces. Collegeville, Minn.: Liturgical Press, 2003.
 Meier, John P. A Marginal Jew: Rethinking the Historical Jesus, Volume Two: Mentor, Message and Miracles. Anchor Bible Reference Library, New York: Doubleday, 1994.
 Theissen, Gerd. The Shadow of the Galilean: The Quest of the Historical Jesus in Narrative Form. Philadelphia: Fortress, 1987.

External links

 Herodias, A Dramatic Poem by Joseph Converse Heywood.
 Herodias (third of the Three Tales), by Gustave Flaubert (English).

10s BC births
Jews and Judaism in the Roman Empire
Herodian dynasty
People in the canonical gospels
1st-century women
Women in the New Testament
1st-century deaths
Jewish royalty
Ancient princesses